Invisible City may refer to:
 Invisible City (film), a 2009 documentary film by Hubert Davis
 Invisible City (TV series), a Brazilian fantasy web television series by Carlos Saldanha
 "Invisible City", a song by Scottish band Primal Scream
 Invisible City, a podcast from Jennifer Keesmaat

See also
 Invisible Cities, a novel by Italian writer Italo Calvino
 The Invisible City of Kitezh, a 1907 Russian opera by Nikolai Rimsky-Korsakov